Ust-Kinelsky is an urban locality (urban-type settlement) under the administrative jurisdiction of the town of oblast significance of Kinel of Samara Oblast, Russia. Population:

References

Notes

Sources

Urban-type settlements in Samara Oblast